Varosha may refer to:

Places

Cyprus
 Varosha, quarter in Famagusta,  Cyprus

Bulgaria
 Varosha, quarter in Blagoevgrad
 Varosha, quarter in Razgrad
 Varosha, quarter in Lovech
 Varosha architectural complex in Lovech